This is a list of recording sessions at Van Gelder Studio in the 1950s.

Rudy Van Gelder commenced recording part-time in 1952 in Hackensack, beginning a long-standing association with the Blue Note label, but soon recorded for other labels including Prestige and Savoy. At the end of the decade, he moved to a purpose-built studio in Englewood Cliffs.

List of recording sessions

References

 
1950s-related lists
Van Gelder Studio
Van Gelder Studio